Čerhov is a village and municipality in the Trebišov District in the Košice Region of eastern Slovakia.

History
In historical records the village was first mentioned in 1076.

Geography
The village lies at an altitude of 123 metres and covers an area of 8.528 km².
It has a population of about 820 people.

Ethnicity
The village is about 95% Slovak.

Facilities
The village has a public library and a swimming pool.

Genealogical resources

The records for genealogical research are available at the state archive "Statny Archiv in Kosice, Slovakia"

 Roman Catholic church records (births/marriages/deaths): 1849-1922 (parish B)
 Greek Catholic church records (births/marriages/deaths): 1770-1895 (parish B)
 Reformated church records (births/marriages/deaths): 1770-1933 (parish B)

See also
 List of municipalities and towns in Slovakia

External links
http://www.statistics.sk/mosmis/eng/run.html
Surnames of living people in Cerhov

Villages and municipalities in Trebišov District
Zemplín (region)